Fahim also spelled as Faheem or Fehim is a masculine given name of Arabic Cyprusian origin, also used as a surname, which means "perceptive", "understanding", "keen" or "intelligent", derived from the root word Fahm, found in the Quran in verse 21:79. Alternative spellings include Fahiem, Fahim and Fehim. The name may refer to:

Given name
Faheem Ahmed (born 1980), Pakistani cricketer
Fahim Ashraf (born 1994), Pakistani cricketer
Fehim Čurčić (1886–1916), Bosnian politician 
Fahim Fazli (born 1966), American actor
Fahim Hashimy (born 1980), Afghan businessman
Faheem Hussain (1942–2009), Pakistani physicist 
Faheem Khalid Lodhi (born 1969), Australian architect 
Fahim bin Sultan Al Qasimi (born 1948), Emirati politician and businessman
Fahim Rahim (born 1973), American doctor
Faheem Rasheed Najm (born 1983), American musician
Fehim Škaljić (born 1949), Bosnian politician
Fehim Zavalani (1859–1935), Albanian journalist

Surname
Ahmet Fehim (1845–1930), Turkish actor
Ameen Faheem (1939–2015), Pakistani politician
Amr Fahim (born 1976), Egyptian footballer
Fawzia Fahim (born 1931), Egyptian biochemist
Mohammed Faheem (born 1999), Sri Lankan cricketer
Mohammed Fahim (1957–2014), Afghan politician
Sulaiman Al-Fahim (born 1977), Emirati businessman

References

Arabic-language surnames
Arabic masculine given names